Cleveland Institute of Electronics (CIE) was a privately held, for-profit, distance learning technical college located in Cleveland, Ohio.  CIE permanently closed on September 30, 2022.

CIE offered Diplomas and Certificates from a variety of electronics and computer technology programs. The school was certified through the Ohio State Board of Career Colleges and Schools to offer post secondary programs of electronics technology, computer technology and electronic engineering technology.

History
The Institute was established in 1934 by Carl E. Smith under the name Smith Practical Radio Institute to provide correspondence learning courses in the field of Radio and Electronics, and has attracted an international student body since its inception. 
In 1972, enrollment reached 40,000 students from 70 countries. 
In 1992, a wholly owned subsidiary, World College, was added to CIE, but this subsidiary college has since closed in Summer of 2014.  CIE permanently closed on September 30, 2022.

Innovations
In 1956, Cleveland Institute of Electronics conceptualized and patented its "Auto-Programmed" method, a new approach to curriculum presentation.

In the 1960s, Carl Smith commissioned Pickett & Eckel Company to manufacture a slide rule tailored toward the school's course modules. The model became known as the Pickett N515-T Electronic Slide Rule.

Programs of study
CIE offered numerous certificates and diplomas in Electronics, Broadcast Engineering Technology (Leading to CBT designation by the Society of Broadcast Engineers), and Computing fields.

Undergraduate Diplomas and Certificates
 Broadcast Engineering
 CompTIA A+ Certification and Computer Technology
 Network+ Certification and Computer Technology
 Programming with Java and C#
 Engineering
 Electronics Technology and Advanced Troubleshooting I & II
 Electronics Technology with Digital and Microprocessor Laboratories
 Electronics Technology with FCC License Preparation
 Electronics Technology with Laboratory
 Industrial Electronics with PLC Technology
 Introduction to Computers and Microsoft Office
 Introduction to Home Automation Installation
 Introduction to Photovoltaic Systems
 Wireless and Electronic Communications

Associate's of Applied Science Degrees
 A.A.S. in Computer Information Technology and Systems Management
 A.A.S. in Electronic Engineering Technology
 A.A.S. in Software Engineering
 Bachelor in Electronic Engineering Technology - via World College
 Bachelor in Computer Information Technology and Systems Management - Via World College

References

External links
 Official Cleveland Institute of Electronics Website
   World College Website
   World College 2013 Website
 CIE Bookstore
 US Department of Education - Accreditation
 World College listing with IAU International Association of Universities UNESCO

Cleveland institute
Distance education institutions based in the United States
Universities and colleges in Cleveland
Educational institutions established in 1934
Technological universities in the United States
1934 establishments in Ohio